Alida Elisabeth "Lidy" Stoppelman (born 3 July 1933 in Amsterdam) is a Dutch former figure skater. She won three national titles and competed at the 1952 Winter Olympics in Oslo, Norway.

Results

External links

1933 births
Living people
Dutch female single skaters
Figure skaters at the 1952 Winter Olympics
Sportspeople from Amsterdam